Angus Carl Alexander "Gus" McKenzie (born 29 December 1954) is a retired Scottish hurdler and bobsledder. He competed in the four man event at the 1984 Winter Olympics.

References

1954 births
Living people
British male bobsledders
Scottish male bobsledders
Scottish male hurdlers
Commonwealth Games competitors for Scotland
Athletes (track and field) at the 1974 British Commonwealth Games
Olympic bobsledders of Great Britain
Bobsledders at the 1984 Winter Olympics
Sportspeople from Edinburgh